GSP Saturn is a semi-submersible, jackup independent leg cantilever drilling rig operated by GSP Drilling, a Grup Servicii Petroliere subsidiary, and currently contracted by Wintershall Noordzee for drilling in the North Sea. The drilling unit is registered in Panama.

Description
GSP Saturn drilling rig was designed by Sonat Offshore and was built by Petrom at the Galaţi Shipyard in 1988. The rig was completely reconstructed and refurbished in 2009 at a cost of US$50 million. The rig was owned and operated by Petrom from 1988 to 2005 when the company sold its six offshore platforms (including Atlas, Jupiter, Orizont, Prometeu and Saturn) to Grup Servicii Petroliere for US$100 million.

As a drilling rig, GSP Saturn is equipped with advanced drilling equipment and has to meet strict levels of certification under international law. GSP Saturn is able to maneuver with its own engines (to counter drift and ocean currents), but for long-distance relocation it must be moved by specialist tugboats. The rig is capable of withstanding severe sea conditions including  waves and  winds.

Operations
Currently the GSP Saturn is operated by the Dutch company Wintershall Noordzee

References

External links
Official website

1988 ships
Jack-up rigs
Semi-submersibles
Ships built in Romania